Vasily Surikov is a 1959 Soviet drama film directed by Anatoli Rybakov.

Plot 
The film is a biographical drama about the life and work of the great Russian painter Vasily Surikov.

Cast 
 Yevgeni Lazarev as Vasily Ivanovich Surikov
 Larisa Kadochnikova as Yelizaveta Avgustovna Surikova
 Leonid Gallis as Avgust Share, Lilya's father
 Gennady Yudin as Aleksei Alekseyevich Lunyov
 Georgy Vitsin as Ilya Yefimovich Repin
 Ivan Kudryavtsev as Ivan Nikolayevich Kramskoi
 Anatoly Fedorinov as Pavel Mikhailovich Tretyakov
 Vladimir Belokurov as Pyotr Kuznetsov
 Nikolai Sergeyev as black-bearded man
 Vladimir Kashpur as yurodivy
 Yevgeny Morgunov as snow town commandant

References

External links 
 

1959 films
1950s Russian-language films
Soviet drama films
1959 drama films